Fusolatirus suduirauti is a species of sea snail, a marine gastropod mollusc in the family Fasciolariidae, the spindle snails, the tulip snails and their allies.

Description
The shell size varies between 25 mm and 50 mm

Distribution
This species is distributed in the seas off the Philippines.

References

 Fraussen K. 2003. Two new Euthria (Gastropoda, Buccinidae) from Philippine Islands. Gloria Maris 42(1): 22–30

External links
 

Fasciolariidae
Gastropods described in 2003